This list of medical schools in Iran includes major academic institutions in Iran that award Doctor of Medicine (MD) degrees.

Current medical schools

References

Medical Schools In Iran, List Of
Iran, List Of Medical Schools In
Medical education in Iran